Choo Min-yeol is a South Korean football forward who plays for Bucheon 1995.

References

External links 
 

1999 births
Living people
Association football forwards
South Korean footballers
Bucheon FC 1995 players
K League 2 players